Mia Gypsy Mello da Silva Goth (born 25 October 1993) is an English actress. She is the granddaughter of Brazilian actress Maria Gladys and American artist Lee Jaffe. Following a brief stint in modelling as a teenager, Goth made her feature film debut in the erotic art film Nymphomaniac (2013). She gained further recognition with films such as The Survivalist (2015), High Life (2018), Suspiria (2018), and Emma (2020).

Goth achieved a career breakthrough for starring in the X slasher film series films X and Pearl (both 2022), the latter of which she also co-wrote. She has since starred in the horror film Infinity Pool (2023).

Early life
Goth was born in Guy's Hospital in London, England. Her mother is Brazilian and her father is Canadian, originally from Nova Scotia. Her maternal grandfather is Jewish-American artist Lee Jaffe, and her maternal grandmother is Brazilian actress Maria Gladys.

Goth moved to Brazil when she was a few weeks old, because her mother, who was 20 at the time, needed help from her family to raise her. They returned to the United Kingdom when she was five and briefly relocated to her father's native Canada when she was ten. There, she attended nine schools in a single school year; Goth said that the period when they tried living with her father was very difficult. When she was twelve, she and her mother settled in southeast London, where she attended Sydenham School. Goth's mother raised her in a single-parent household, working as a waitress to support them.

Career

2012–2021: Acting debut and early work
When Goth was 14, she was discovered at the Underage Festival in London by fashion photographer Gemma Booth, who signed her to Storm Model Management. She subsequently appeared in advertisements for Vogue and Miu Miu. She began to audition for films at 16, and after finishing sixth form, won her first role in Lars von Trier's Nymphomaniac (2013), along with Charlotte Gainsbourg and Willem Dafoe in the segment "The Gun". Goth played Sophie Campbell in an episode of Sky Atlantic's crime drama series The Tunnel.

In 2014, she appeared in Future Unlimited's music video for "Haunted Love," directed by Shia LaBeouf. She then appeared in the Stephen Fingleton directed introductory short film Magpie with Martin McCann. In 2015, Goth played the lead role of Milja in the post-apocalyptic thriller The Survivalist directed by Fingleton, followed by roles as Meg Weathers in the disaster adventure-thriller film Everest (2015) directed by Baltasar Kormákur, and Hanna Helmqvist in an episode of BBC One's crime series Wallander.

She also appeared in the horror film A Cure for Wellness (2016) directed by Gore Verbinski and had supporting roles in Luca Guadagnino's remake of Suspiria (2018) and the sci-fi mystery film High Life (2018) directed by Claire Denis. Goth appeared in Guadagnino's short film The Staggering Girl (2019) and Autumn de Wilde's period romantic comedy film Emma (2020). She also starred in Karen Cinorre's action drama film Mayday (2021) with Grace Van Patten and Juliette Lewis.

2022–present: Breakthrough and critical acclaim
Goth starred in Ti West's slasher film X, released in March 2022 to critical acclaim. Goth donned extensive prosthetic makeup to portray the elderly Pearl. Describing her experience, Goth stated, "It was a good 10 hours in the makeup chair, and then I'd go and do a 12-hour day on set, and the makeup artist, Sarah Rubano, who was incredible, would constantly be touching me up and making sure my contacts were all right and all those sorts of things." She received praise for her roles as both protagonist Maxine Minx and antagonist Pearl, with West stating, "She understood the characters really well, and she understood the duality of Maxine and Pearl." She subsequently starred in the prequel film Pearl, which she co-wrote with West and began filming immediately after X. The film was released in September 2022 to positive reviews. Goth's performance in the film received unanimous praise with Williams Earl, in a piece for Variety, contending that it deserves attention from the Academy Awards.

Goth next starred in Brandon Cronenberg's thriller Infinity Pool opposite Alexander Skarsgård. The film premiered at the 2023 Sundance Film Festival and was released in the United States on 27 January 2023 to positive critical reception, with her performance receiving praise. David Fear of Rolling Stone wrote “Goth makes an even stronger post-Pearl case for her being the single most interesting actor working in genre movies at the moment” and Meagan Navarro of Bloody Disgusting concluded “Goth progresses her character’s devious machinations with a scene-stealing level of unhinged glee that might give Pearl a run for her money”.

Goth will reprise the role of Maxine Minx in the X sequel MaXXXine. Goth is set to appear in the crime thriller Sweet Dreams. She is also to be attached to star in Guillermo Del Toro's Frankenstein.

Personal life
Goth met American actor Shia LaBeouf while co-starring in Nymphomaniac in 2012. On 10 October 2016, Goth and LaBeouf appeared to get married in a Las Vegas ceremony officiated by an Elvis impersonator. Two days later, a local official claimed that the pair were not legally married, but instead a commitment ceremony was performed. Later that month, LaBeouf confirmed their nuptials on The Ellen DeGeneres Show. In September 2018, it was announced the couple had separated and filed for divorce. However, in February 2022, it was reported that Goth was pregnant with their first child. They have a daughter, Isabel, born in March 2022.

Filmography

Film

Television

Awards and nominations

Notes

References

External links

 Mia Goth at Cultura
 
 Mia Goth on Models.com

Living people
1993 births
21st-century English actresses
Actresses from London
Actresses of Brazilian descent
British actors of Latin American descent
English people of American-Jewish descent
English people of Brazilian descent
English people of Canadian descent
English television actresses
English film actresses
English female models
English emigrants to Canada
English emigrants to Brazil
British expatriate actresses in the United States